The second series of All That Glitters: Britain's Next Jewellery Star started on 25 August 2022 and aired for six episodes concluding on 29 September 2022. The series was hosted by Katherine Ryan and the judges were  Shaun Leane and Dinny Hall. Filming took place at the Birmingham School of Jewellery.

Jewellers

Results and eliminations

Colour key

 Jeweller got through to the next round
 Jeweller was eliminated
 Jeweller was the series runner-up
 Jeweller was the series winner

Episodes
 Jeweller eliminated  
 Jeweller of the Week 
 Winner

Episode 1

The Best Seller challenge was to make a single statement earring featuring a bezel set cabochon stone. The Bespoke Brief was to make a nameplate necklace.

Episode 2

The Best Seller challenge was to make a spinner ring, with one or more spinning circles on the outside of the ring. The Bespoke Brief was to make a hairpin.

Episode 3

The Best Seller challenge was to make a pearl necklace with a chain. The Bespoke Brief was to make a sentimental charm bracelet.

Episode 4

The Best Seller challenge was to make a Birmingham themed brooch. The Bespoke Brief was to make an ear cuff for a client who wears a hearing aid.

Episode 5

The Best Seller challenge was to make mismatched earrings, using 9 carat gold and semi-precious gems. The Bespoke Brief was to make a set of cufflinks.

Episode 6: Final

The Best Seller challenge was to make an engagement ring, using an oval sapphire and 18 carat gold. The Bespoke Brief was to make an occasion necklace, using at least one gemstone.

References

2022 British television seasons
All That Glitters: Britain's Next Jewellery Star